Torpedo Nizhny Novgorod is a professional ice hockey club in Nizhny Novgorod, Russia. It is a member of the Bobrov Division in the Kontinental Hockey League.

The team's home arena is Trade Union Sport Palace. The team used to play its home games at Konovalenko Sports Palace, named after Viktor Konovalenko – one of the most famous Soviet goaltenders, who played for the Torpedoes.

History
The first official ice hockey tournament in Gorky (the Communist-era name of Nizhny Novgorod) took place in early 1947, when the team was the winner of the first Avtozavodtsev Cup.  In the 1947–48 season, the team was in the national championship. It was the official sports club of the submarine service of the Soviet Navy. The 1960–61 season was the most significant in the history of Torpedo, with the team winning the Avtozavodtsev Cup and the Soviet Sport Cup, reaching the final of the Cup of the Soviet Union, and finally winning the silver medal in the national championship.  Torpedo was the first provincial team to place in the USSR championship in 1961. Gorkovchan's success that year is attributed, primarily, to head coach Dmitry Boginova, who managed to create a strong and cohesive team in just a few years. Goalie Konovalenko was later a two-time Olympic champion and eight-time world champion.

Twice the team fell just short of the bronze in 1982 and 1985. In the 1980s, Gorky twice won the Thunderstorm Authority prize. The Torpedo players in those years were constantly being called to different teams, with some seasons including the loss of up to ten players to other teams. In the championships of the MHL, RHL and Russia, which have been held since the Soviet collapse, Torpedo has not achieved significant success, with the best year in 1995, when the team placed fourth in the playoffs of the MHL championship.

Season-by-season KHL record
Note: GP = Games played, W = Wins, OTW = Overtime Wins, OTL = Overtime Losses, SOW = Shootout Wins, SOL = Shootout Losses, L = Losses, GF = Goals for, GA = Goals against, Pts = Points

Players

Current roster

NHL alumni

 Evgeny Namestnikov (1988–91)
 Pavel Torgaev (1995–96, 1999–2000)
 Alexei Tezikov (1998–2000, 2001–02)
 Artem Chubarov (1999–2004)
 Yuri Butsayev (2007–09)
 Matt Ellison (2010–2013)
 Ryan Vesce (2010–2012)
 Wojtek Wolski (2013–2015)
 Chris Wideman (2020–2021)

All-time records
RSL/KHL Games – Anatoli Vodopianov – 653 games
Games – Oleg Namestnikov, 720 games
RSL/KHL Goals – Alexander Skvortsov, 244
RSL/KHL Assists – Alexander Skvortsov, 204
RSL/KHL Points – Alexander Skvortsov, 448
PIM – Vladimir Kovin – 570 minutes

Honours

Champions
 Vysshaya Liga (2):  2003, 2007
 Steel Cup (1):  2015
 Dukla Cup (1):  2016
 Bodense Cup (1):  2017

Runners-up
 Soviet League Championship (1):  1961
 USSR Cup (1):  1961
 Spengler Cup (1): 1972

References

External links

  

 
Ice hockey teams in Russia
Sport in Nizhny Novgorod
Kontinental Hockey League teams
Ice hockey clubs established in 1946
1946 establishments in the Soviet Union